Eastern Poland is a macroregion in Poland comprising the Lublin, Podkarpackie, Podlaskie, Świętokrzyskie, and Warmian-Masurian voivodeships.

The make-up of the distinct macroregion is based not only of geographical criteria, but also economical: in 2005, these five voivodeships has the lowest GDP per capita in the enlarged European Union. On this basis, the macroregion is subject to special additional support with European funds under the Eastern Poland Economic Promotion Programme over 20072013.

In 20122013, the macroregion was the subject of an advertising campaign, Why didn't you invest in Eastern Poland?, which was to raise awareness of and increase investment in the region.

References

External links
 Operational Programme Development of Eastern Poland

Regions of Poland
Economy of Poland